Cinderella (Apakah Cinta Hanyalah Mimpi?) (lit. "Cinderella (Is Love Just a Dream?)") is an Indonesian soap opera produced by MD Entertainment that aired on SCTV in 2007. The soap opera first aired on February 5, 2007 and ended on December 9, 2007 after 308 episodes. The theme song soundtrack titled "Let's Dance Together" was sung by Melly Goeslaw with BBB.

The soap opera starred among others Cinta Laura, Galih Ginanjar, Eva Laurent, Rezky Aditya, Kiki Farrel, Lydia Kandou, Nena Rosier, Siti Anizah, and Herfiza Novianti. The soap opera aired every day at 18:00. This drama also aired in Malaysia on TV2 channel Monday to Thursday 12:30 pm WMP. The soap opera won "Famous Program" award at the 2007 SCTV Awards.

Cast 
 Cinta Laura as Cinta
 Galih Ginanjar as Rasya
 Eva Laurent as Nana
 Revand T. Narya as Akhbar
 Sofyan Hadi as Reihan
 Rezky Aditya as Rama
 Kiki Farrel as Davin
 Nena Rosier as Cynthia
 Lydia Kandou as Marlina
 Shandy Ishabella as Cinta
 Fandy Christian as Haizat
 Siti Anizah as Lala
 Fendy Chow as Levi
 Poppy Bunga as Nina
 Herfiza Novianti as Lulu
 Beauty Lupita as Monica
 Irvan Farhad as Arga
 Sheza Idris as Hera
 Putri Luna as Alisha
 Aiman Ricky as Alan
 Afifa Syahira as Mina
 Cahya Kamila as Salma
 Ervan Naro as Fadli
 Zaneta Georgina
 Jehan Sienna
 Metta Permadi as Dania
 Nia Ramadhani as Cameo

Awards and nominations

References

External links 
 Kiki Farrel profile, cast of Cinderella (Apakah Cinta Hanyalah Mimpi?)

2007 Indonesian television series debuts
2007 Indonesian television series endings
2000s Indonesian television series
Indonesian-language television shows
2009 in Indonesian television